Johanna Annikki Ikonen (born 9 January 1969) is a Finnish ice hockey coach and former defenceman, currently serving as head coach of ESC Planegg-Würmtal in the German Women's Ice Hockey League (DFEL). She represented  in the women's ice hockey tournament at the 1998 Winter Olympics for Finland, and won a bronze medal. Ikonen was born in Eno.

References

External links
 
 

1969 births
Living people
Finnish expatriate ice hockey people in Austria
Finnish expatriate ice hockey people in Sweden
Finnish ice hockey coaches
Finnish women's ice hockey defencemen
HIFK Naiset players
Ice hockey players at the 1998 Winter Olympics
Kiekko-Espoo Naiset players
Medalists at the 1998 Winter Olympics
Naisten Liiga (ice hockey) coaches
Olympic bronze medalists for Finland
Olympic ice hockey players of Finland
Olympic medalists in ice hockey
People from Joensuu
Sportspeople from North Karelia
Swedish Women's Hockey League coaches
Finnish expatriate ice hockey coaches